Brigadier General George William St George Grogan,  (1 September 1875 – 3 January 1962) was a career officer in the British Army and a recipient of the Victoria Cross, the highest award for gallantry in the face of the enemy that can be awarded to British and Commonwealth forces.

Military career
Educated at Haileybury and Imperial Service College and the Royal Military College, Sandhurst, Grogan was commissioned into the West India Regiment serving in Sierra Leone in the Hut Tax War of 1898. Promoted to captain on 5 November 1900, he was seconded for service with the Egyptian Army in May 1902, and stayed there for five years. In 1907 he joined the Yorkshire Light Infantry, moving to the Worcestershire Regiment in 1908.

Promoted to major on 28 September 1914, Grogan joined the 2nd Battalion, 2nd Division, of the British Expeditionary Force. Wounded in January 1915, after the Battle of Neuve Chapelle he took command of the 1st Battalion as temporary lieutenant colonel. On 1 January 1916 he was created a Companion of the Order of St Michael and St George (CMG) and was mentioned in despatches. After fighting in the Battle of the Somme in 1916, he was awarded the Distinguished Service Order (DSO) in March 1917 and was appointed to command the 23rd Brigade, 8th Division, from April 1917 as temporary brigadier general. The citation for his DSO read:

In the retreat during Operation Michael in March 1918, Grogan's efforts resulted in the award of a Bar to his DSO. The citation for the award read:

During the Third Battle of the Aisne, Grogan won the VC for inspiring the defence of a hill above the River Vesle at Jonchery during 27–29 May 1918. The citation for the award read:

In 1919 Grogan was sent with the 1st Brigade of the "Relief Force Russia" under Lord Rawlinson to evacuate the North Russia intervention forces. On 3 June 1919 he was made a Companion of the Order of the Bath (CB). In October 1923 he reached the substantive rank of colonel, commanding the 5th Infantry Brigade in the 2nd Division.

Grogan served as an aide-de-camp (equerry) to King George V from 1920 to 1926, and retired as an honorary brigadier general in 1926. In 1933–45 he was appointed one of His Majesty's Bodyguard of the Honourable Corps of Gentlemen at Arms. He was honorary colonel of the Worcestershire Regiment from 1938 to 1945.

Family
Grogan was the son of Colonel Edward George Grogan CB CBE, who commanded the 1st Battalion Black Watch in the Second Boer War, and his wife Meta, only daughter of Admiral Sir Sir William King-Hall. His paternal grandfather was Captain George Grogan of Sutton, County Dublin, a captain in the 6th Dragoon Guards.

On 22 January 1920 Grogan married Ethel G Elger, eldest daughter of John Elger the Younger, at Holy Trinity Church, Chelsea, London. They had two sons: Gwyn, born 7 August 1921, and Edward, born 27 June 1924.

References

External links
Location of grave and VC medal (Woking Crematorium)
Longer article, seen in 2012
 

1875 births
1962 deaths
British Army personnel of the Russian Civil War
British Army generals of World War I
British World War I recipients of the Victoria Cross
Companions of the Distinguished Service Order
Companions of the Order of St Michael and St George
Companions of the Order of the Bath
Graduates of the Royal Military College, Sandhurst
Honourable Corps of Gentlemen at Arms
West India Regiment officers
Worcestershire Regiment officers
People educated at United Services College
British Army recipients of the Victoria Cross
People educated at Stubbington House School
People educated at Haileybury and Imperial Service College
Military personnel from Devonport, Plymouth
British Army brigadiers